"Good Morning Baltimore" is the opening number of the 2002 musical Hairspray. Written by Marc Shaiman and Scott Wittman, it is performed by the protagonist, Tracy Turnblad, and alludes to the distinctive beat and vocal effects ("oh-oh-oh") of The Ronettes' 1963 hit "Be My Baby".

Production
In the 2007 film, Tracy, played by Nikki Blonsky, blinks her eyes in time with the music at the beginning of this number.

Synopsis
Tracy Turnblad wakes up to a new day in Baltimore, and sings about everything she encounters on the way to school. She dreams of being a star. The song "takes us through Tracy’s morning routine, for instance, hitching a ride with the garbage man when she misses the bus for school."

Analysis
About.com examines the song's themes:

Answers.com adds further insight:

Critical reception
BroadwayReviewed said "'Good Morning Baltimore' from the musical Hairspray is one of the most well known songs from the broadway show. Not only does everyone love this show tune, but it is an awesome song to represent the city. It is positive, funny and a bit quirky, just like Baltimore." It adds the song "is the perfect way to open the show because it isn’t just funny, but it is a fun song to sing. It walks you through the city and you even somewhat feel like you are actually there when she is describing it." Talkin' broadway described the song as "lovably cheesy 1960s pop". Common Sense Media said this "infectious song...sets the cheery tone" of the rest of the 2007 film. Similarly, CinemaBlend explains "The song immediately sets the toe-tapping tone for the rest of the film".

Reprise 
A reprise is performed by Tracy as she is imprisoned for protesting. The lyrics are changed to show Tracy's loneliness and love for Link.

References

2002 songs
Songs from Hairspray (musical)
Songs about Baltimore
Songs written by Marc Shaiman
Songs written by Scott Wittman